Wayamba University of Sri Lanka is the thirteenth national university in Sri Lanka. It was established as the Affiliated University College of North Western Province in 1991 and after it was become the Rajarata University of Sri Lanka "Wayamba mandapa" in 1996.It was a full flagged university naming as Wayamba University of Sri Lanka in 1999. The main purpose of the university is offering English-medium degree, diploma and certificate courses (internal and external) in areas such as Agriculture, Applied Science, Management and Technology for students and working professionals. The courses are highly up-to-date and job-oriented.

The Wayamba University of Sri Lanka is headquartered at Kuliyapitiya, Sri Lanka. Its six faculties are in Makandura and Kuliyapitiya. The Faculty of Applied Sciences, Faculty of Business Studies, Finance and Faculty of Technology and Faculty of Medicine were established at Kuliyapitiya. The Faculty of Agriculture and Plantation Management and Faculty of Livestock, Fisheries, and Nutrition are in Makandura.

Faculty of Agriculture and Plantation Management 

The Faculty of Agriculture and Plantation Management is the oldest in the university and located in Makandura premises. Four departments were assigned with faculty of Agriculture and Plantation Management.

 Department of Agribusiness management
 Department of Biotechnology
 Department of Horticulture and landscape gardening
 Department of Plantation Management
 Department of Bio Systems Engineering

Faculty of Applied Sciences 

The Faculty of Applied Sciences was established with effect from 1 October 1999 by the Government Notification in the Extraordinary Gazette No. 1093/8 of Tuesday, 17 August 1999. The faculty is in Kuliyapitiya and was assigned with four Departments of study.

 Department of Computing & Information Systems
 Department of Electronics
 Department of Industrial Management
 Department of Mathematical Sciences

Department of Computing & Information Systems 

The Department of Computing and Information Systems is one of four departments in the Faculty of Applied Science. It is one of the earliest departments in the university, having been established in 1999.

The department was established with the objective to equip the students with a sound knowledge on IT to face the challenges at their own work and employment. Therefore, the department offers course modules along with projects and an industrial training programme, to achieve the above objectives.

Department of Electronics 

The Department of Electronics was initiated in 2000 under the Faculty of Applied Sciences. This is the only department in the University System, which offers Electronics as a major subject for the Physical Science undergraduates.

Department of Industrial Management 

The Department of Industrial Management has realized the future challenges and the importance of socio-economic development of Sri Lanka. Therefore, the Department of Industrial Management has articulated its main objective to produce readily employable graduates to face 21st century management challenges.

Department of Mathematical Sciences 

Department of Mathematical Sciences is one of the most important department in the Faculty of Applied Sciences. The department commenced academic activities in 1996, the oldest department in the Faculty. Around 30-40 students enrolling in the courses every year.

Although the computer laboratories of the Department of Computing & Information Systems are primarily intended to facilitate the conduct of practical components in computing and information systems, they provide facilities for those undertaking project work and offering other major subjects.

Faculty of Livestock, Fisheries & Nutrition 

The Faculty of Livestock, Fisheries & Nutrition (FLFN) has four departments:
 Department of Food Science & Technology
 Department of Applied Nutrition
 Department of Livestock & Avian Sciences
 Department of Aquaculture & Fisheries

The Faculty has been offering BSc in Food Science & Nutrition degree since 2001. This degree programme in the combined disciplines is the first of its kind in the Sri Lankan university system.

Faculty offers BSc in Food Production & Technology Management from academic year 2008–2009. Both degree programmes are offered in English medium with four-year duration. The annual enrolment for the BSc Food Science & Nutrition degree programme is 100 students, whereas for the BSc Food Production & Technology Management, 50 students.

Two degree programmes of the faculty have been designed to train graduates to meet the national needs for higher education in the relevant sectors. Faculty is committed to develop a strong research programme and outreach programmes which will contribute to the development of the food and nutrition sectors in Sri Lanka. The development of skills and knowledge necessary for the undergraduates to be self-employed in the relevant sectors is also a major consideration.

FLFN is in an ideal environment with food & agribusiness, industrial and commercial activities. Apart from small- and medium-scale business even large establishments have started operation in the region in the recent past. Faculty has established links with national and regional industries, business establishments, research institutes and government and non-governmental organizations. Faculty has initiated several research activities with industry collaborations.

Faculty of Business Studies and Finance
Department of Accountancy
Department of Business Management
Department of Banking and Finance
Department of Insurance and Valuation
Department of English Language Teaching

Faculty of Technology 
Department of Construction Technology
Department of Electrotechnology
Department of Mechanical and manufacturing Technology
Department of Nano Science Technology

Student life
The Computer Unit and the English Language Teaching Unit, which come under the purview of the vice-chancellor, operate through a director or a coordinator, offer service courses to the undergraduates of both faculties at Kuliyapitiya to further their IT, oral and written communication skills.

An academic year consists of two semesters of 15 weeks each. Academic programs are based on a course credit system, which embodies characteristics such as modularity, flexibility, and accumulation of credits. After a semester, a two-week study leave is given before the semester-end examinations conducted in a three-week period. However, examinations of practical components, project work, in-plant training programs, etc. may be held before the semester-end examination period as decided by the department.

Notable faculty 

 Sevvandi Jayakody - marine biologist.

References

External links
Official website

 
Education in North Western Province, Sri Lanka
Statutory boards of Sri Lanka
Universities in Sri Lanka
1999 establishments in Sri Lanka
Educational institutions established in 1999